Sammie Lee Hill (born November 8, 1986) is a former American football defensive tackle. He was drafted by the Detroit Lions in the fourth round of the 2009 NFL Draft. He played college football at Stillman. He was also a member of the Tennessee Titans.

Early years
Hill played high school football at West Blocton High School in West Blocton, Alabama.

College career
He played at Stillman College in Tuscaloosa, Alabama from 2005 to 2008.

Professional career

Detroit Lions
Hill was drafted by the Detroit Lions in the fourth round of the 2009 NFL Draft and was the first player from Stillman to be drafted.

Tennessee Titans
On March 13, 2013, Hill signed a three-year, $11.4 million contract, including $4 million guaranteed with the Tennessee Titans.

References

External links
Detroit Lions bio

1986 births
Living people
People from Bibb County, Alabama
American football defensive tackles
Stillman Tigers football players
Detroit Lions players
Tennessee Titans players